Tanya Melich is one of the founders of the modern women's political movement. She was born in Moab, Utah on April 23, 1936 and co-founded the National Women's Political Caucus and was an early leader of the National Women's Education Fund, which focused on educating women in gaining political power. Melich attended every Republican National Convention from 1952 through 1996 except 1984. Melich served on the staffs of Nelson Rockefeller, Jacob Javits, Charles Goodell, and John Lindsay. In 1998, she left the Republican Party over women's issues. She coined the phrase, "Republican war against women." She now considers herself a Jeffords independent in the mold of the former U.S. Senator from Vermont.

Tanya Melich attended the University of Colorado and received a B.S. in political science in 1958, graduating cum laude with departmental and general honors. She was also elected to Phi Beta Kappa. She then attended Columbia University, receiving a master's degree in public law and government in 1961.

At the 1988 Republican National Convention in New Orleans, Louisiana, Melich tried to remove the anti-abortion plank from the party platform and substitute a neutral position on abortion. She was acting at the time as the executive director of the New York State Republican Family Committee. Her proposal was shelved in the platform hearings by conservative forces led by Marilyn Thayer, a New Orleans Republican activist who chaired the platform subcommittee on family issues and who in 1996 was elected president of the National Federation of Republican Women, the party conservatives kept the pro-life language intact. Years later, Melich wrote about her experiences at the convention in her book, The Republican War Against Women: An Insider's Report from Behind the Lines.

Melich is considered one of the founders of the modern women's movement. In 1971 she helped organize the Manhattan Women's Political Caucus. She went on to co-found the New York State National Women's Political Caucus (NYS NWPC) in 1972. In 1973, she became affiliated with the National Women's Education Fund, the first organization designed to educate women on ways to gain political power. Melich served as the Fund's president from 1980 through 1983. Concerned with the treatment of women in American society, she wanted women's issues to have more of an impact on the Republican Party's agenda. In 1976 Melich co-founded the National Women's Republican Task Force and was instrumental in organizing the group New York State Republicans for Women's Issues. In 1984 she co-founded the New York State Republican Family Committee. Both of the organizations advocated the Republican Party to take a pro-choice stance and recognize the needs and concerns of women to a greater extent.

Her father, Mitchell Melich, served in the Utah State Senate, was president of the Utah Mining Association, on the Republican National Committee from Utah, the University of Utah Board of Regents and ran unsuccessfully for governor of Utah in 1964 against the Democrat Cal Rampton. He was appointed by President Richard M. Nixon to serve as Solicitor of the U.S. Interior Department, 1969-73.

Her mother, Doris Marie Snyder Melich, founded the first Girl Scout troop in Moab, Utah in 1946 that led to her thirty years of service to the state and national Girl Scouts. She served as a member, executive committee and president of the Utah chapter of the Arthritis Foundation, 1959–82, was appointed by President Gerald Ford to the National Arthritis Board, 1977–84 and was a member of the National Commission on Arthritis and Related  Musculoskeletal Diseases, 1974-76.

Books
 1996 The Republican War Against Women: An Insider's Report From Behind the Lines

Professional positions 
 Political Issues Management, President, consultant in public policy analysis and strategy, political management, 1982-2002.
 New York State Republican Family Committee, Executive Director, a non-profit, educational organizational concerned with family issues, particularly related to women and children, 1984-1994
 CBS Inc., Corporate Affairs; Director, Civic Affairs, 1978–81; Associate Director, Public Policy Unit, 1976–78; Editor, Corporate Information, 1975-76.
 Nelson A. Rockefeller, consultant, Developed background books for national trips, advised on public issues and politics for vice-presidential confirmation hearings, 1974.
 Academy for Educational Development, Fall-Winter 1973. Writer, editor.
 Commission on Critical Choices, Policy Analyst, 1973
 Philip Van Slyck Inc.; Public Affairs writer, 1971–72
 U.S.Senator Charles Goodell Election Committee, New York State Chairman for Research, 1970.
 Allen-Van Slyck Group, Public Affairs writer, 1969
 Rockefeller for President, Co-director, National Delegate unit, 1968
 Thomas E. Dewey, Editorial Assistant for Dewey memoir, 1967–68
 Rockefeller for Governor of New York, Scheduler, 1966
 Lindsay for Mayor of New York City, GOP Research Director, 1965
 ABC News, Director of National Election Research, 1963–64
 Foreign Policy Association, Researcher-Writer, 1962
 The Salt Lake Tribune, News Reporter, 1957
 Citizenship Clearing House, Political Intern for Colorado Republican gubernatorial candidate, Don Brotzman, 1956

Honors 

 Advisory Committee of the New York City Department of Cultural Affairs, 1994-98.
 New York Children and Family Trust Fund Advisory Board, Fall, 1992
 Public Leadership Education Network, Visitor, Spring, 1991
 Alfred E. Moran Public Advocacy Award, 1990
 Woodrow Wilson Fellows Program, 1988-2012
 Outstanding Woman Award, NWPC-Manhattan, 1986
 European-American Summer School, USIA, Austria, 1985
 New York State Commission on Judicial Nomination, 1983–91
 Aspen Institute, Guest Contributor, West Berlin, May 1983; AT&T Seminar, May 1982, Communications Seminar, October 1980.
 Harvard University, Kennedy School of Government, Institute of Politics, Fellow, January–June, 1980.
 N.O.W.--New York, Susan B. Anthony Women of Achievement Award, 1980.
 Republican National Committee Advisory Council on Natural Resources, 1977-80.
 U.S. Civil Rights Commission, New York State Advisory Committee, 1973–81
 Republican National Convention: Delegate, NY, 1992; Alternate Delegate, 1980, 1976, 1972.

See also
War on women

References

Year of birth missing (living people)
Living people
People from Moab, Utah
Activists from New York City
New York (state) Republicans
American feminists